Frederick Vere Harold (5 September 1888 – 17 February 1964) was an English first-class cricketer who represented Hampshire in two matches. Harold made his debut in the 1909 County Championship against Derbyshire. His second and final match came against local rivals Sussex in 1912.

Harold died in Southall, Middlesex on 17 February 1964.

External links
Frederick Harold at Cricinfo
Frederick Harold at CricketArchive

1888 births
1964 deaths
People from Totton and Eling
English cricketers
Hampshire cricketers